The Jabach Altarpiece is an oil on lime tree panel painting by German Renaissance artist Albrecht Dürer, executed around 1503–1504. Originally a triptych, only the side panels are now preserved: the right picture, measuring 96×54 cm, is housed in the Wallraf-Richartz Museum of Cologne; the left picture, measuring 96×51 cm, is housed in the Städel of Frankfurt.

History
The altarpiece was probably commissioned by Frederick III, Elector of Saxony, for a chapel in his castle at Wittenberg, perhaps in occasion of the end of the plague in 1503.

The reconstruction of the work is disputed. Some art historians identify the central panel with the Uffizi Adoration of the Magi, while according to others there was instead a group of sculptures. The Apostles on gilded background now at the Alte Pinakothek of Munich have also been associated with the polyptych: in this view, the two known paintings would form a single image on the external shutters once closed; in fact, the two share a common background, and the dress of Job's wife continues to the right panel as well.

It is named after one of its owners, Everhard Jabach, in whose family chapel it was still hanging in the late 18th century, before being split up and scattered to different locations.

Description

The left panel depicts the prophet Job seated, with a desperate expression on his face, after Satan has defied him to keep his allegiance to God even in the most tremendous afflictions. These include his flock getting scattered in the other panel, while his properties are on fire at the left edge. Further, his skin is covered by blisters, an appropriate element for a painting likely originated as an ex-voto for the end of plague. His wife, dressed in Renaissance garments, is pouring dirty water above him, while a small devil flees in the far background.

The right panel shows two standing musicians. The right one, with the drum, is perhaps a self-portrait. Their meaning has not been explained: they could be a further element of mockery against Job, or, instead, an attempt to console him through music.

References

Sources

Paintings by Albrecht Dürer
1500s paintings
Paintings in the collection of the Städel
Collections of the Wallraf–Richartz Museum
Paintings depicting Hebrew Bible themes
Altarpieces
Musical instruments in art
Water in art